Jasmin Muharemović (born 22 February 1965) is a popular Bosnian pop-folk singer.

In 1983 he moved in Požarevac in order to meet Novica Urošević, the folk hit-maker, and start a professional folk singer career. Muharemović's first album sold 250,000 copies, and he had great success as a beginner. In 1994, due to the war in his home country, formerly a part of Yugoslavia, he moved to Vienna. He lives between Vienna and his birth city Tešanj. He has three sisters and three brothers, one brother being the singer Esad Plavi.

Discography
Ja sam taj (1987, Diskos) *composed by N.Urošević
Prvi momak (1988, Diskos) *composed by N.Urošević
Osvajač (1989, Diskos) *composed by N.Urošević
Bolje ljubav, nego rat (1991, Diskos) *composed by N.Urošević
Sve me boli (1994)
Crna ženo (1995)
Vjernost i nevjersnost (1998) *composed by N.Urošević
Ginem, ginem (1999)
Nešto nemoguće (2001)
Jasmina (2003)
Žilet (2005)
Ubaci me u mašinu (2007)
Ljubav mala, briga velika (2010)

References

1965 births
Living people
People from Tešanj
Bosnia and Herzegovina folk-pop singers
Bosniaks of Bosnia and Herzegovina
20th-century Bosnia and Herzegovina male singers
BN Music artists
Yugoslav male singers